Charles-Elie Laprévotte (born 4 October 1992) is a French professional footballer who plays as a defensive midfielder for National 3 club Bayonne.

Career
Laprévotte made his debut in the Bundesliga for SC Freiburg on 27 August 2013 against Bayern Munich.

On 21 December 2020, Laprévotte joined German Regionalliga Südwest club Kickers Offenbach.

Laprévotte joined National 3 club Bayonne in August 2022.

References

External links
 

Living people
1992 births
Association football midfielders
French footballers
Bundesliga players
2. Bundesliga players
3. Liga players
Regionalliga players
Championnat National 3 players
SC Freiburg players
SC Preußen Münster players
1. FC Magdeburg players
Kickers Offenbach players
SV Elversberg players
Aviron Bayonnais FC players
Expatriate footballers in Germany
French expatriate sportspeople in Germany